The 2016 Bryant Bulldogs football team represented Bryant University during the 2016 NCAA Division I FCS football season. They were led by thirteenth-year head coach Marty Fine and played their home games at Beirne Stadium. The stadium was renamed Beirnie Stadium from Bulldog Stadium on September 25th.  They were a member of the Northeast Conference. They finished the season 5–6, 4–2 in NEC play to finish in a tie for third place.

On December 1, head coach Marty Fine resigned. He finished at Bryant with a 13 year record of 80–61.

Schedule

Game summaries

Merrimack

at Montana State

Brown

Central Connecticut

at Maine

at Saint Francis (PA)

Wagner

at Duquesne

Robert Morris

at Coastal Carolina

at Sacred Heart

References

Bryant
Bryant Bulldogs football seasons
Bryant Bulldogs football